Desmond H. Collins is a Canadian paleontologist, associate professor of zoology at the University of Toronto and retired curator of invertebrate paleontology at the Royal Ontario Museum. He is most renowned for his work on the Burgess Shale.

References

External links 
 Desmond H. Collins at Wikispecies
 The "Evolution" of Anomalocaris and Its Classification in the Arthropod Class Dinocarida (nov.) and Order Radiodonta (nov.), Desmond Collins, March 1996, Journal of Paleontology, Vol. 70, No. 2., pp. 280–293
 The arthropod Alalcomenaeus cambricus Simonetta, from the Middle Cambrian Burgess Shale of British Columbia, Briggs, D. E G. and D. Collins, 1999, Palaeontology 42, pp. 953–977

Academic staff of the University of Toronto
Canadian paleontologists
Living people
Year of birth missing (living people)